Jalpaiguri Road railway station is one of the railway station which serves Jalpaiguri city in Jalpaiguri district in the Indian state of West Bengal. The others are: Jalpaiguri City, Mohitnagar/Jalpaiguri Halt, and The station is a newly built-up station connecting the Barauni–Guwahati line and the New Mal–New Changrabandha–New Cooch Behar line.

History
During the British period all connections from southern parts of Bengal to North Bengal were through the eastern part of Bengal. From 1878, the railway route from Kolkata, then called Calcutta, was in two laps. The first lap was a 185 km journey along the Eastern Bengal State Railway from Calcutta Station (later renamed Sealdah) to Damookdeah Ghat on the southern bank of the Padma River, then across the river in a ferry and the second lap of the journey. A 336 km metre-gauge line of the North Bengal Railway linked Saraghat on the northern bank of the Padma to Siliguri via Jalpaiguri.

The 1.8 km long Hardinge Bridge across the Padma came up in 1912. In 1926 the metre-gauge section north of the bridge was converted to broad gauge, and so the entire Calcutta–Siliguri route became broad-gauge. The route thus ran: Sealdah–Ranaghat–Bheramara–Hardinge Bridge–Iswardi–Santahar––Parabtipur–Nilphamari–––Siliguri.

With the partition of India, this track got trisected. The through route was formally closed after the India–Pakistan War in 1965.

The Siliguri–Haldibari, part of the original broad-gauge Calcutta–Siliguri track via Hardinge Bridge, got delinked from the trunk route in 1947. As all the other tracks in the area were metre gauge, it was converted from broad gauge to metre gauge in the late forties. When New Jalpaiguri railway station came up, the line was extended to New Jalpiguri. When broad-gauge lines were laid in the area, it was reconverted to broad gauge and now functions as the Haldibari–New Jalpaiguri line.

References

External links
Departures from Jalpaiguri Road railway station
 

Katihar railway division
Railway stations in Jalpaiguri district
Railway stations opened in 1915
Transport in Jalpaiguri
1915 establishments in India